Ian Schrager (born July 19, 1946) is an American entrepreneur, hotelier and real estate developer, credited for co-creating the "boutique hotel" category of accommodation. Originally, he gained fame as co-owner and co-founder of Studio 54.

Early life and education
Schrager grew up in a Jewish family in New York City. His father Louis owned a factory in Long Branch, New Jersey, which manufactured women's coats and died when Schrager was 19. His mother, Blanche, died when he was 23.

In 1968, he graduated from Syracuse University with a BA and then earned a JD from St. John's University School of Law in 1971. While at Syracuse, he was a member and eventual president of the Sigma Alpha Mu fraternity. It was through this fraternity that he met fellow brother Steve Rubell, with whom he would eventually go into business.

Career
In the early 1970s, Schrager with Steve Rubell and Jon Addison bought 15 Lansdowne Street in Boston for a discotheque (the former The Ark, later Boston Tea Party).

1975: Enchanted Garden
In December 1975, after practicing law for three years, Schrager partnered with Rubell to open Enchanted Garden, a disco in Douglaston, Queens.

Seeing the success of Enchanted Garden, Schrager and Rubell decided to open a nightclub in Manhattan.

1977–1980: Studio 54 era

In January 1977, Schrager and Rubell signed the lease for Studio 54, renting a space that had originally been the Gallo Opera House and last served as a CBS studio. Six weeks later, it opened. They drew on the venue's existing theatrical infrastructure to change the club's look and feel constantly, creating exciting sets that transformed the space. Multiple times each night, they dramatically reinvented the environment, size, and design of Studio 54. They often hosted special "one-night-only" theme parties, for which the club underwent complete metamorphosis with intricate sets and performance art.

In December 1978, Studio 54 was raided after Rubell had been quoted as saying that only the Mafia made more money than the club brought in. In June 1979, Rubell and Schrager were charged with tax evasion, obstruction of justice, and conspiracy for reportedly skimming nearly $2.5 million in unreported income from the club's receipts, in a system Rubell called "cash-in, cash-out and skim." Police reports state that cash and receipts were in the building and were hidden in the ceiling sections of Rubell's office, where both he and Schrager worked.

A second raid occurred in December 1979. The pair hired Roy Cohn to defend them, but on January 18, 1980, they were sentenced to three and a half years in prison and a $20,000 fine each for the tax evasion charge. On February 4, 1980, Rubell and Schrager went to prison, and Studio 54 was sold in November of that year for $4.75 million. On January 30, 1981, Rubell and Schrager were released from prison to a  halfway house for two and a half months.

On January 17, 2017, Schrager received a full and unconditional pardon from President Barack Obama.

Palladium
After Studio 54, Schrager and Rubell opened their next nightclub, Palladium, in the old Academy of Music building in New York City. They enlisted world-renowned Japanese architect Arata Isozaki to reimagine the old music hall into a nightclub, while still maintaining the space's integrity. Palladium was the first of its kind in that art was the focal point of the club's experience. He collaborated with artists Francesco Clemente, Jean-Michel Basquiat, Julian Schnabel, Kenny Scharf, and Keith Haring to create a curated environment. Large video installations lining the dance floor were "undeniably powerful" as part of the art and architecture; throughout the night, multiple dynamic installations were featured as the screens were raised and lowered like pieces of a stage set.   Schrager recognized the power great architecture had to influence an environment; working with Arata was just the beginning of his dabbling in architecture. He has since worked with architects, artists and designers such as Philippe Starck, Herzog & de Meuron, Andree Putnam, Julian Schnabel and John Pawson, to name a few.

1984–2005: Morgans Hotel Group
Turning their attention to hotels, they found that their "on the pulse," keen instincts for the mood and feel of popular culture gave them a unique perspective that would allow them to significantly impact the hospitality industry just as they had done with nightlife.

Morgans Hotel: World's first boutique hotel
In 1984, Schrager and Rubell opened their first hotel, Morgans Hotel, named after John Pierpont (JP) Morgan's Morgan Library & Museum next-door. The instant hit introduced the boutique hotel category, becoming a "worldwide phenomenon."

Royalton Hotel & Paramount Hotel: Lobby socializing
Following the success of Morgans Hotel, they opened the well-received Royalton Hotel and Paramount Hotel, both designed by Philippe Starck. With these properties, Schrager introduced "lobby socializing" where the hotel lobby became a new kind of gathering place for hotel guests and New York City residents alike, and "cheap chic" was affordable luxury offered in a stylish, sophisticated environment.

Delano Hotel & Mondrian Hotel: Urban resort
Schrager is also credited with inventing the "urban resort" concept with his Delano Hotel in Miami and Mondrian Hotel in West Hollywood, also designed by Starck.

Hudson Hotel et al.: Hotel as lifestyle
These were followed by the Hudson Hotel in New York, where he fully realized his concept "hotel as lifestyle" which he continued to refine, expanding to cities such as San Francisco with the Clift Hotel and London with St. Martins Lane Hotel and the Sanderson Hotel, all designed by the prolific Starck.

Schrager stayed in the hotel business and went solo after he lost his partner Steve Rubell, who died of early exposure to AIDS on July 25, 1989.

NASDAQ: $MHG IPO
In June 2005, Schrager sold most of his stake in Morgans Hotel Group. Despite stepping down as chair and CEO, he retained $4 million in consultant pay and perks through end of 2007.

On Valentine's Day 2006, the namesake $MHG IPO'ed in a $360 million-target raise underwritten by Morgan Stanley, with Schrager cashing in his remaining 450,000 shares for another $9 million. Morgans Hotel Group was a publicly traded company on NASDAQ for over a decade.

2005–present: Ian Schrager Company
The same year, he launched the Ian Schrager Company, which owns, develops and manages hotels, residential and mixed-use projects.

Gramercy Park Hotel
Since then, he has collaborated with Julian Schnabel to transform the Gramercy Park Hotel in New York City (which he no longer owns).

Schrager has also built two residential properties: 40 Bond and 50 Gramercy Park North. 40 Bond was designed by Swiss architects Herzog & de Meuron as their first residential project in America.

PUBLIC Hotel
Schrager has a new hotel brand, Public.  Schrager's Public Hotel Chicago opened in 2011. It was Schrager's first new project as an independent hotelier since 2005, after selling Morgans Hotel Group. Schrager later sold the Chicago hotel in 2016 to Gaw Capital Partners, based in Hong Kong. On June 7, 2017, Schrager opened the 367-room Public Hotel New York, at 215 Chrystie Street in the Bowery district. Public Hotel New York claims to have the fastest hotel wi-fi in New York City, which is free. The idea behind Public New York is "luxury for all," charging an inexpensive rate for quality and service. Most recently, it was chosen as the location for the afterparty for Garden of Turkish Delights, the first solo show in New York by esteemed Turkish artist, Sarp Yavuz, in cooperation with Trotter and Sholer, an emerging fine art gallery in NYC’s Lower East Side.

EDITION Hotel
Schrager's latest venture is EDITION Hotels, a partnership with Marriott International, intending to create a new brand of hotel with about 100 properties to be located in cities throughout North America, South America, Europe, and Asia. EDITION currently has hotels in London, Miami Beach, New York City, Sanya (China), Barcelona, Bodrum, Shanghai, Abu Dhabi and West Hollywood. According to their website, new hotels are slated to open in Tokyo (two properties in Toranomon and Ginza), Reykjavik, Rome, Tampa, the Mexican Riviera, Las Vegas, Madrid, Bali, Dubai, Singapore, Milan, Doha, Nashville, Scottsdale and Kuala Lumpur.

On May 20, 2020, it was announced that the Times Square EDITION in New York City would be closing permanently on August 13 after only 1 year in operation after going into foreclosure in December 2019, with financial problems exacerbated by the COVID-19 pandemic on New York and the global travel industry. However, it reopened in June 2021.

Personal life
Schrager married Rita Noroña, a Cuban ballet dancer, on Valentine's Day in 1994. They have two daughters.

On November 15, 2008, he married Tania Wahlstedt (née Garcia-Stefanovich), a former ballerina with the New York City Ballet. She has two daughters from a previous marriage and they have a son together.

Awards 
In June 2022, Schrager was recognized by the International Hospitality Institute on the Global 100 in Hospitality as one of the 100 Most Powerful People in Global Hospitality.

See also
Morgans Hotel Group
 List of people pardoned or granted clemency by the president of the United States
Bill Marriott

References

External links

Ian Schrager personal bio

Videos
Charlie Rose - Interview, November 28, 2006 (c. 38:50 mark)
CBS News - Interview, May 5, 2007
Bloomberg - Schrager on boutique hotels and Studio 54, July 3, 2007

1946 births
Living people
American hoteliers
American real estate businesspeople
Nightlife in New York City
20th-century American Jews
St. John's University School of Law alumni
Syracuse University alumni
Businesspeople from New York City
21st-century American Jews